Tropiphorus is a genus of broad-nosed weevils in the beetle family Curculionidae. There are about 18 described species in Tropiphorus.

Species
These 18 species belong to the genus Tropiphorus:

 Tropiphorus albanicus Apfelbeck, 1928 c g
 Tropiphorus bertolinii Stierlin, 1894 c g
 Tropiphorus caesius (Frivaldszky, 1879) c g
 Tropiphorus carinatus (Müller, 1776) i
 Tropiphorus cucullatus Fauvel, 1888 c g
 Tropiphorus elevatus Kraatz, G., 1882 c g b
 Tropiphorus fiorii Pedroni, 2006 c g
 Tropiphorus imperator Pesarini, 1995 c g
 Tropiphorus micans Boheman, 1842 c g
 Tropiphorus moldavicus Penecke, 1924 c g
 Tropiphorus norici Yunakov, 2013 c g
 Tropiphorus obtusus (Bonsdorff, 1785) i c g b
 Tropiphorus ochraceosignatus Boheman, 1842 c g
 Tropiphorus paulae Pedroni, 2012 c g
 Tropiphorus serbicus Reitter, 1901 c g
 Tropiphorus styriacus Bedel, 1885 c g
 Tropiphorus terricola (Newman, 1838) i c g b
 Tropiphorus transsylvanicus Daniel K. et Daniel J., 1898 c g

Data sources: i = ITIS, c = Catalogue of Life, g = GBIF, b = Bugguide.net

References

Further reading

External links

 

Entiminae